Sully-sur-Loire (literally Sully on Loire) is a commune in the Loiret department, north-central France. It is the seat of the canton of Sully-sur-Loire. It lies on the left bank of the river Loire.

Population

Castles

The château of Sully-sur-Loire dates from the end of the 14th century and is a prime example of a medieval fortress. It was built at a strategic crossing of the Loire river.  The château was expanded by Maximilien de Béthune, first duke of Sully and prime minister of King Henry IV of France (1560–1641), who is buried on the grounds of his château. The family of the dukes of Sully retained ownership of the château until the 20th century.

King Louis XIV, his mother Queen Anne of Austria and prime minister Cardinal Mazarin sought refuge in the château of Sully-sur-Loire in March 1652 after they were driven out of Paris during the revolt of the French nobility known as the Fronde.

See also
 Communes of the Loiret department

References

External links

 Official website of the château of Sully-sur-Loire 
 Official website of the Château de la Huardière, Sully-sur-Loire

Sullysurloire
Orléanais